Pelluebla is a locality in Victoria, Australia in the Shire of Moira local government area.

Pelluebla post office opened on 1 April 1880 and closed on 1 July 1893.

References

External links

Towns in Victoria (Australia)
Shire of Moira